John Hardwick may refer to:

 John Hardwick (director) (born 1965), British television and film director
 John Hardwick (politician) (1867–1943), Australian politician
 Johnny Hardwick (born 1958), American comedian and voice actor